"Lay Some Happiness on Me" is a song that was first released by Eddy Arnold in 1966, on the album Somebody Like Me. The song became a hit in 1967, when it was released by Dean Martin and by Bobby Wright.

Dean Martin's version spent 5 weeks on the Billboard Hot 100 chart, peaking at No. 55, while reaching No. 6 on Billboards Easy Listening chart, and No. 44 on Canada's RPM 100.

Bobby Wright's version reached No. 44 on Billboards Hot Country Singles chart.

Nancy Sinatra covered that song for the 1967 album Country, My Way.

References

1966 songs
1967 singles
Dean Martin songs
Bobby Wright songs
Decca Records singles
Reprise Records singles
Songs written by Jean Chapel
Song recordings produced by Jimmy Bowen